USS Bracken (APA-64) was a  that served with the United States Navy from 1944 to 1946. She was sunk as a target in 1948.

History
Bracken was named after the county in Kentucky. She was launched 10 June 1944 by the Consolidated Steel Corporation at Wilmington, California, under a Maritime Commission contract; acquired from the Maritime Commission 3 October 1944, and commissioned 4 October 1944.

World War II
Between 28 October 1944 and 31 March 1945 Bracken operated off the coast of southern California as a training ship for the crews of 22 subsequent ships of her class.

During May 1945 Bracken took aboard passengers and cargo and proceeded to Pearl Harbor.

On 3 July 1945, Bracken loaded a full crew of replacement troops and proceeded to sail to the Marshall Islands, the Caroline Islands, and Okinawa.

After hostilities
Departing Pearl Harbor she called at Midway, Hilo, Eniwetok, Ulithi, Okinawa, Saipan, Leyte, Samar, and Cebu taking aboard occupation troops for transportation to Yokohama, Japan, where she arrived 8 September 1945. Bracken then joined Operation Magic Carpet, which was tasked with transporting returning servicemen from the Far East to the United States.

Operation Crossroads
Bracken remained on this duty until February 1946, when she commenced preparation as a target ship for Operation Crossroads, the atomic bomb tests at Bikini Atoll. She survived the atomic test and was maintained for radiological and structural studies until 10 March 1948 when she was towed to the open sea off Kwajalein and sunk.

References

USS Bracken (APA-64), Navsource Online.

Gilliam-class attack transports
Transports of the United States Navy
World War II auxiliary ships of the United States
World War II amphibious warfare vessels of the United States
Bracken County, Kentucky
Ships built in Los Angeles
1944 ships
Ships involved in Operation Crossroads
Ships sunk as targets
Maritime incidents in 1946
Maritime incidents in 1948